Thousand Thoughts is the fourth studio album by rapper Bohemia. It was released on August 30, 2012, under the label of Sony Music India. It won Best International Album award at PTC Punjabi Music Awards in 2013. 
It was produced and recorded at L.A.-based Diamond Mine Studio by Ravi Soni.

Track listing

Awards

|-
|rowspan="4" style="text-align:center;"|2013
| rowspan="1" style="text-align:center;"| "Thousand Thoughts"
|Best International Album at PTC Punjabi music awards
|

References

External links

Punjabi albums
2012 albums